Mohamed Ali Bouleymane (10 May 1942 – 4 October 2021) was a Tunisian politician. He served as Mayor of Tunis from 1986 to 1988 and again from 1990 to 2000.

Biography
Bouleymane studied at HEC Paris. He became mayor of Tunis in 1986 and was appointed to work for the Ministry of Equipment in 1988. Following this mandate, he returned to serving as mayor of Tunis from 1990 to 2000, when he was removed by President Zine El Abidine Ben Ali.

In 2011, he became a member of the board of directors of Candax Energy and was also non-executive president of Ecumed Petroleum.

Bouleymane died on 4 October 2021, at the age of 79.

Decorations
Commander of the Legion of Honour

References

1942 births
2021 deaths
20th-century Tunisian politicians
Socialist Destourian Party politicians
Democratic Constitutional Rally politicians
Mayors of Tunis
Commandeurs of the Légion d'honneur
HEC Paris alumni